Green Arrow: Year One is a 2007 Green Arrow limited series published by DC Comics. The series is written by Andy Diggle with art by Jock, the acclaimed team behind The Losers.

Plot summary
Oliver Queen is a frivolous playboy and a thrill-seeker. After yet another drunken party, he decided to embark on a sea voyage only to be betrayed by his only friend and trusted bodyguard Hackett. He then found himself marooned on a deserted jungle island.

Oliver survived his new unforgiving environment with nothing more than a makeshift bow and arrows, gradually realizing that he is a natural-born bowman. Being stranded on the island for months taught him to treasure the simple things he had squandered and for the first time in his life, he felt really happy.

Things took a turn for the worse when he learned that the island was not as deserted as he thought. A woman whom he called China White had enslaved the island's inhabitants and forced them to grow opium and manufacture heroin. After a tussle with Hackett, who turned out to be her business associate, Oliver was seriously wounded. Taiana, one of the natives of the island, saved him from certain death.

Her selfless act of kindness opened Oliver's eyes to the guilt he had been carrying his entire life: the guilt of stepping over the underprivileged on his way to the top. To repay the debt he owed Taiana, he made it his life's calling to fight for the rights of the downtrodden. He then freed the slaves by taking down China White's organization, armed only with Howard Hill's bow (which the earlier party had an auction for) and a dozen arrows.

When the authorities arrived, Oliver downplayed the whole scenario. He sacrificed the credit of busting a drug ring in order to protect the lives of Taiana's people.  Believing that it is not his style to bask in the limelight anymore, he chose to live a double-life as a brash socialite by day and by night, someone he never dreamed he would be, a hero. Upon his return to Star City, he crafted a costume and took the name Taiana gave him: Green Arrow.

Collected editions
Green Arrow: Year One was first collected in hardcover in 2008 and later as a trade paperback in 2009.

In other media
The limited series served as an inspiration for the regular flashback sequences featured in the live-action TV show, Arrow broadcast on The CW from 2012. Showrunner Marc Guggenheim acknowledged that an original character to the television series, John Diggle, portrayed by David Ramsey, was named in honor of the comic series author Andy Diggle: "We felt like we were drawing enough inspiration for Year One that we felt we should name a character after Andy [Diggle], and so we did". John Diggle's brother Andy Diggle was introduced into the series in season three, portrayed by Eugene Byrd.

References

External links

Jock on Green Arrow: Year One, Newsarama, May 7, 2007

Green Arrow
DC Comics storylines
2007 comics debuts
2007 comics endings